Lissodiadema is the only genus in the family Lissodiadematidae.

References 

Diadematoida
Taxa named by Ole Theodor Jensen Mortensen